is a Japanese music television program. Broadcasting live weekly on TV Asahi since October 24, 1986, it currently airs from 9PM-10PM on Fridays. The show is currently syndicated throughout the U.S.

The program has been aired internationally on Animax's networks in Southeast Asia, Hong Kong, Taiwan, and other regions from March 2007. It is also broadcast in the United States and Canada through the NHK-owned TV Japan, in Hong Kong via TVB J2, in Singapore through Hello Japan! and in the People's Republic of China through CCTV-15.

History
Music Station is a weekly one-hour music program similar to the American TRL or the British Top of the Pops. It is home to various performances as well as single rankings and other corners. Many Japanese musical acts make their debut on Music Station, but the show has also hosted many artists from around the world. As of October 2021, over 8,300 songs had been performed on the show.

From October 24, 1986, to March 31, 2000, Music Station was broadcast live on Fridays from 20:00–20:54 JST. It briefly switched to 19:54–20:48 JST from April 14 to September 15, 2000. The show returned to its previous schedule on October 6, 2000, and stayed there until September 13, 2019. After TV Asahi restructured its prime time slot, Music Station has been broadcast from 21:00–21:54 JST since October 18, 2019. This change was done to capture the young audience, whom, according to Tamori, are no longer home at 20:00.

On February 12, 2010, the show celebrated its 1000th episode with a special episode. In celebration of its 25th anniversary, Music Station launched its official YouTube channel and an internet show, Young Guns on the Web (based on its Young Guns segment).

Presenters
Music Station has been hosted by famed Japanese TV-comedian Tamori since April 3, 1987. To date he has appeared in nearly every episode, marking over 1,360 appearances as the host. In 2021, he was certified as holding the Guinness World Record for "Longest running live TV music show hosted by the same presenter". The show is co-hosted by TV Asahi announcer  (since October 19, 2018). The two provide banter for the show in between performances.

 was the co-host from 1996 to 2000. , TV Asahi broadcaster, was the co-host from 2000 to 2004.  was the previous co-host from 2004 to 2008. Dō first appeared on the show on April 9, 2004. This episode was a 3-hour special titled: New Start Best 100. Dō joining the program was a surprise to the media, as she was new to the industry and had only been hired by TV Asahi nine days before becoming the co-host of a prime time program. After 4½ years, she graduated from the program on September 12, 2008, with Autumn Special Part 1. Yoshie Takeuchi served the co-host role from October 3, 2008, to September 27, 2013. Ayaka Hironaka was the co-host from October 18, 2013, to September 7, 2018.

Segments 
Music Station is home to various weekly segments, the most common being the weekly singles ranking and the monthly album ranking.

Music Station Ranking
The Music Station Ranking segment began in November 2017. It is a renewal of the "Music Topics" segment.

Music Station Young Guns
Young Guns is a segment on Music Station that has been done sporadically since it began on February 18, 2005. It gives information about new rising artists in the Japanese music scene. The segment normally involves a VTR (video presentation) before giving a small interview and performing their first song.

Former segments
 CD Single Ranking
Music Station Single Ranking covered the top 10 selling singles of the week. Their chart differed from the Oricon charts in that Oricon charts the sales from Monday to Sunday, whereas Music Station's chart reflects the sales from Friday to Thursday. This segment appeared in nearly every episode of the program since 1989. Many of the highest selling artists would perform on Music Station if their single happened to break a certain personal or nationwide record. The last ranking was broadcast on February 24, 2017.

 CD Album Hit Ranking
CD Album Hit Ranking was a monthly album ranking, charting the highest selling albums of the time. The segment also included live performances by bands/singers to promote their new album releases. The last ranking was broadcast in September 2010.

 Music Topics
Most weeks, Music Station has a segment called Music Topics (Mトピ “emu-topi”). Music Topics goes in depth about the current goings on in the Japanese music scene.

 Chat Sessions
Chat Sessions was a weekly segment on Music Station. It often featured a new artist or actor appearing to promote a new project or film. It was one of the longest appearing segments on the show. The show's co-hosts chatted with the weekly guests as well as that week's "Special Guest", often taking questions from audience members. Since July 2005, this segment has gone on hiatus due to lack of questions submitted, and thus there are now only regular talks with the week's performers.

 Mini Music Station
Airing just before the main show started, the co-host talked to 1 or 2 of the artists on that episode, then introduced the other artists watching that segment before announcing that the show would begin shortly.

Yearly specials 
Each year, Music Station hold various specials all over Japan. Some of these include, best seasonal songs, anniversary specials and such. These can range anywhere from 2 to 3 hours in length. There will also be various specials with no actual artists performances, these will often be the current hosts discussing the history of the shows and playing some of the more notable performances.

2006 Specials
Music Station Special Love and Winter Song Request Best 111 - January 13, 2 hour chat special
Music Station Special Spring Song Request Best 111 - March 31, 3 hour artists special
Music Station Special Summer Song Request Best 111 - June 30 2 hour chat special
Music Station Special 20th Anniversary Best Clips - September 9, 2 hour artists special
Music Station Special 20th Anniversary Best 100x2 - October 13, 3 hour artists special

2007 Specials
Music Station Special Love Songs Man & Women Best 50x2 - January 12, 2 hour chat special
Music Station Special Spring Special Part 1 Artist Debut Song - March 16, 2 hour artist special
Music Station Special Spring Special Part 2 Spring Songs Best 111 - April 6, 3 hour artist special

Super Live 
In 1992 Music Station introduced their largest yearly live event, the Music Station Super Live. Music Station Super Live is held late December normally occurring just before or just after Christmas, as a Christmas/year-end celebration concert. In 1998, it occurred on Christmas Day. The artists are normally asked about how their year was and how they are planning their year ahead. Initially the specials ran for three hours but as of 2003 have since been expanded to four hours. Super Lives commonly have 20 to 40 artists performing; the 2006 edition featured 43 artists. The 2006 edition of Super Live was also later aired worldwide by Animax across its network in Southeast Asia, premiering on February 17, 2007.  The 2007 edition was also aired on February 9 and 10, 2008, on Animax. In 2019, in honor of the network's 60th anniversary, the Music Station Ultra Fes (a special version of the show that aired regularly around fall), and the Super Live was combined to make Music Station Ultra Super Live, a show that ran for over 11 hours (12:00 P.M. JST ~ 11:10 P.M. JST) and was attended by 49 acts.

Music Station Super Live was held at Tokyo Bay NK Hall in Chiba from 1992 to 2003. In 2004, it was held at the Saitama Super Arena. Since 2005, it is held at the Makuhari Messe Event Hall.

References

External links 
Official website 

1986 Japanese television series debuts
TV Asahi original programming
Animax
TVB original programming
Japanese music chart television shows